John Ducey Park was a 6,500-seat baseball stadium in Edmonton, Alberta, Canada. Originally built in 1933, it was torn down after sixty years of use in 1995 and replaced by Telus Field on the same site. Beginning in 1981, John Ducey Park was the home field for the AAA Edmonton Trappers of the Pacific Coast League.

The stadium was originally known as Renfrew Park, but was renamed in later years for John Ducey, an Edmonton baseball executive, promoter, general manager, scout and coach.

Prior to Renfrew Park, Diamond Park was Edmonton's main baseball field. The field could hold a maximum of 2,500 spectators by law.

John Ducey Park was the site where in 1982 Ron Kittle of the Trappers hit his 50th home run of the season in the last game of the year. Kittle was named Minor League Player of the Year.

The stadium hosted the 1990 Baseball World Cup.

References

External links
 Digital Ball Parks - Renfrew Park

Defunct baseball venues in Canada
Sports venues in Edmonton
Defunct sports venues in Canada
Sports venues completed in 1935
Sports venues demolished in 1995
1995 disestablishments in Alberta
Demolished buildings and structures in Alberta
Defunct minor league baseball venues
1935 establishments in Alberta
Demolished sports venues
Baseball venues in Alberta